Gösta Löfgren (10 September 1891 – 21 February 1932) was a Finnish footballer.

Club career 
Löfgren played in Finland for Unitas Sports Club and HIFK. He was a member of the 1908 Unitas squad winning the first ever Finnish championship title.

International career 
Löfgren played his first international for Finland in October 1911 against Sweden. It was also the first international match for Finnish national team. Löfgren capped 6 times for Finland and was a member of the Finnish squad at the 1912 Summer Olympics in Stockholm.

Honors 
Finnish Championship: 1908

References 

1891 births
1932 deaths
Footballers from Helsinki
Swedish-speaking Finns
Finnish footballers
Finland international footballers
Footballers at the 1912 Summer Olympics
Olympic footballers of Finland
Association football defenders
20th-century Finnish people